Professor Paul Ekins OBE (born 1950) is a British academic in the field of sustainable economics, currently Professor of Resources and Environment Policy at University College London. He was formerly co-director of the UK Energy Research Centre (2004–2014). He is a former member of the Green Party.

Political career
Ekins was a prominent member of the Green Party UK (now the Green Party of England and Wales) in the 1970s and 1980s. He left in 1986 after controversy over reforms he and others were promoting to streamline Green Party structures. This group, known as "Maingreen", was seen as a forerunner of the moves to reform the party's internal structures by a later group known as Green 2000.

Career after politics
Ekins has been a prominent green academic in the field of sustainable economics. He has also worked as a consultant. In 1996, he set up Forum for the Future with Sara Parkin and Jonathon Porritt. The Forum says: “When Paul Ekins set up the Sustainable Economy Unit as part of Forum for the Future back in 1996, he argued that ‘many of today’s environmental problems are really economic problems in disguise, and getting the economics right lies at the heart of any solutions agenda.’ He aimed ‘to show that radical moves towards environmental sustainability are compatible with prosperity’. This remains a central part of Forum's mission.”

He worked as head of the Environment group at the Policy Studies Institute.

He has worked as an advisor to the Environmental Audit Select Committee of the British House of Commons. In 1994, Ekins received a UN Environment Programme Global 500 Award ”for outstanding environmental achievement”.

Ekins was appointed Officer of the Order of the British Empire (OBE) in the 2015 New Year Honours for services to environmental policy.

Academic career
Paul Ekins took a Ph.D. in economics at Birkbeck, University of London. He became Professor of Sustainable Development at the University of Westminster, from October 2002 – 2007. He is currently Professor of Resources and Environmental Policy at University College London.

His academic work examines the "conditions and policies for achieving an environmentally sustainable economy". Ekins has predicted that substantial reserves of fossil fuels should remain in the ground and not be burned if humans are to prevent temperature increases beyond 2 degrees. His original work with Christophe McGlade in 2015 has been supported by more recent analysis.

Author
He is author of a number of books:

See also
Green Party of England and Wales
Forum for the Future
Policy Studies Institute

References

External links
Policy Studies Institute
Forum for the Future

Green Party of England and Wales politicians
Alumni of Birkbeck, University of London
Academics of the University of Westminster
Officers of the Order of the British Empire
1950 births
Living people
Sustainability advocates